Union Depot is a 1932 American pre-Code film directed by Alfred E. Green for Warner Bros., starring Douglas Fairbanks Jr. and Joan Blondell, and based on an unpublished play by Joe Laurie Jr., Gene Fowler, and Douglas Durkin. The film, an ensemble piece for the studio's contract players, also features performances by Guy Kibbee, Alan Hale, Frank McHugh, David Landau, and George Rosener.

Plot
Charles "Chick" Miller (Douglas Fairbanks Jr.) is a hobo released from jail for vagrancy, along with fellow drifter "Scrap Iron" Scratch (Guy Kibbee). The two men walk to the local railroad station to hop a train out of town. Through a series of chance encounters at Union Depot, Chick becomes, in his words, a "Gentleman for a Day" (the name under which the film was released in the United Kingdom).

At the depot Chick finds in a public washroom a suitcase left by a drunk passenger. In the suitcase are toiletries and a nice double-breasted man's suit with cash in one pocket. After changing into the suit, Chick uses the money to buy a much-needed meal at the depot's diner. Soon he meets Ruth Collins (Joan Blondell) sitting on a bench in the terminal. She tells him she is an out-of-work chorus girl and is desperate to raise $64 for train fare to Salt Lake City, where a job is waiting for her. Initially, he thinks she is a prostitute, although he begins to believe her after she shows him a telegram with her job offer. She then confides to him that she is worried about a "madman" following her, a Dr. Bernardi (George Rosener), who resides in the same boarding house she recently left. She adds that the strange doctor has "bad eyes" and once paid her to read to him in the evenings. Now feeling sorry for Ruth, Chick tells her he will give her the money she needs "with no strings attached".

Back inside the depot, a crook named "Bushy" Sloan (Alan Hale) is impersonating a German musician and is carrying a violin case full of counterfeit money. Bushy checks the case into the station's temporary storage for baggage, but a pickpocket soon steals his wallet, which contains the baggage-claim ticket. The pickpocket discards the wallet in an alleyway after removing its cash. While waiting for Chick outside the depot, Scrap Iron finds the wallet with the ticket. Later he gives the ticket to Chick, who reclaims the violin case. Initially, Chick plans to pawn the case until he opens it and is stunned to see it is full of money, not realizing it is counterfeit. He hides the case and most of the bogus cash in a small coal bin near the depot, and he instructs Scrap Iron to guard it while he leaves to ponder what to do. Chick sees Ruth again and gives her some of the counterfeit cash to buy new clothes at a shop in the station. She too is unaware that the money is not genuine.

While Chick is away, Dr. Bernardi sends Ruth a passenger ticket and a message to meet him in the train's designated compartment. Believing the ticket is from Chick, Ruth goes there and begins screaming when she sees Bernardi. Chick hears her and breaks through the train car's locked door, but Bernardi escapes. As the doctor runs across an adjacent railroad track, he is struck by a passing train and killed. Meanwhile, the dress shop clerk who sold clothes to Ruth becomes suspicious of the cash she used and takes it to the station master. Both Ruth and Chick are then taken into custody by government agents searching for criminals exchanging phony money. Unfortunately, the investigators have no description of Bushy, but they believe Ruth might be his associate. To clear her, Chick goes with another agent to retrieve the hidden violin case. The men are followed by Bushy, who shoots the agent and flees with the case. Chick chases and catches the crook. All is reconciled and Ruth has a bittersweet parting from Chick as she boards the train to Utah.  The film ends with Chick and Scrap Iron walking together along a railroad track, away from Union Depot and back to their lives as hobos.

Cast

 Douglas Fairbanks Jr. as Charles "Chick" Miller
 Joan Blondell as Ruth Collins
 Guy Kibbee as "Scrap Iron" Scratch
 Alan Hale as "The Baron" / Bushy Sloan
 David Landau as Kendall
 George Rosener as Dr. Bernardi
 Earle Foxe as Detective Jim Parker
 Frank McHugh as The Drunk
 Adrienne Dore as Sadie, the dress shop attendant

Further cast:
 Hooper Atchley	 as Station Agent Having No Available Berths (uncredited)
 Irving Bacon	as Depot Hotel Waiter (uncredited)
 Lilian Bond	as Actress on Train (uncredited)
 Nat Carr	 as Magazine Counter Clerk (uncredited)
 George Chandler	as Panhandler Wanting One Dollar (uncredited)
 Spencer Charters	as Police Officer Bert Brady (uncredited)
 Dorothy Christy	as Society Woman Saying Goodbye to Jean (uncredited)
 Frank Coghlan Jr.	as Ragged Urchin (uncredited)
 Charles Coleman	as Reverend Harvey Pike (uncredited)
 Frank Darien	as Doctor / Little Boy's Father (uncredited)
 Mary Doran	as Daisy (uncredited)
 Lester Dorr	as Sailor (uncredited)
 Maude Eburne	as Passenger at Information Desk (uncredited)
 George Ernest	as Eight-Year-Old Boy (uncredited)

 Willie Fung	as Chinese Man (uncredited)
 Harrison Greene	as Eight-Year-Old Boy's Father (uncredited)
 Ethel Griffies	 as Cross Woman at Magazine Stand (uncredited)
 Ruth Hall	 as Welfare Worker's Charge (uncredited)
 Theresa Harris as Black Woman (uncredited)
 Otto Hoffman	 as Station Agent Investigating Screams (uncredited)
 Robert Homans	 as Policeman in Paddy Wagon (uncredited)
 Gladden James	as Taxi Driver (uncredited)
 Eulalie Jensen	as Dress Shop Proprietess (uncredited)
 Lucille La Verne	as Lady with Pipe (uncredited)
 Charles Lane	as Luggage Checkroom Clerk (uncredited)
 John Larkin as Porter with Ticket for Ruth (uncredited)
 George MacFarlane	 as Train Caller (uncredited)
 Sam McDaniel	as Redcap Train Porter (uncredited)
 Claire McDowell	as Little Boy's Mother (uncredited)
 Walter McGrail	as Pickpocket (uncredited)
 Dickie Moore 	as Little Boy (uncredited)
 Toshia Mori	 as Chinese Woman Wanting Sedan (uncredited)
 Franklin Parker	as Station Agent Talking to Reverend Pike (uncredited)
 Jack Raymond	 as Photographer (uncredited)
 Cyril Ring	 as Track 4 Ticket Taker (uncredited)
 Jason Robards Sr.	as Station Agent (uncredited)
 Virginia Sale	as Woman on Platform Watching Actress (uncredited)

Production
The high cost of constructing the large, elaborate train-station set for Union Depot proved in the long run to be worthwhile for Warner Bros., which had purchased First National Pictures several years prior to the production of Union Depot. An article on the Turner Classic Movies site notes "...the film did leave one legacy at the studio. The impressive train station set built for this picture would resurface in Warners' films for years to come, helping keep production costs down in the time-honored Warner Bros. fashion."

Because Union Depot was produced prior to the rigid enforcement of the Motion Picture Production Code, the film's storyline contains many topics that would have, by the latter half of 1934, jeopardized the certificate of approval needed for a production's release in the United States. Some of these forbidden topics in Union Depot include the following:

 Ruth reads what is implied to be very lewd or "off-color" stories to Dr. Bernardi.
 Though Chick stops short of taking advantage of Ruth's plight, she makes it clear that she has "been around" and is willing to do whatever is necessary for the price of a train ticket. Despite this, she emerges unscathed, which ran counter to one of the Hays Code's requirements that "sympathy of the audience should never be thrown to the side of the crime, wrongdoing, evil or sin".
 Chick, who demonstrates that he is a thief, liar and someone quite willing to purchase sexual services, is ultimately neither held accountable for his actions nor "punished" in any way by the end of Union Depot; in fact, he emerges as the film's hero.

Critical reception
The picture launched its New York debut at the Winter Garden Theater, on January 14, 1932.  The New York Times movie critic, Mordaunt Hall, characterized Union Depot as an "ingenious, rather than artistic" melodrama recalling the (then) play Grand Hotel.  He noted that some of the dialogue was at times unnecessarily "raw" and that Mr. Fairbanks appeared to have "taken a leaf from  James Cagney's book, judging by his talk and the way he slaps a girl's face".   He also questioned the realism of a hobo speaking with Mr. Fairbanks' excellent elocution.

The popular entertainment trade publication Variety complimented the performances of Blondell and Fairbanks in what it described as a "bing-bing, action melodrama". Variety also praised the "capital bit of technique" employed in the series of brief scenes at the beginning of the film to establish the plot's tongue-in-cheek attitude toward human (mis)behavior.

Notes

References

External links
 
 
 
 
 The Production Code of the Motion Picture Industry (1930-1968)
 Union Depot - A Rediscovery (Movie Morlocks)

1932 films
1932 drama films
American black-and-white films
American drama films
American films based on plays
Films directed by Alfred E. Green
Films with screenplays by Kubec Glasmon
First National Pictures films
Rail transport films
Counterfeit money in film
1930s English-language films
1930s American films